João Fernandes de Andrade (1470s–1527) was a Portuguese nobleman, who served in the Court of Afonso V and John II of Portugal.

Biography 

João was born in Portugal, son of Fernão Dias Andrade and Beatriz da Maia, a noble woman, daughter of Fernão Álvares da Maia and Guiomar de Sá. He was married to Beatriz de Abreu, daughter of Rui Gomes de Abreu, governor-mor of Elvas, and Inês Brandão.

João Fernandes de Andrade took part in the military campaigns in North Africa. He and his family were among the first settlers and colonizers of the island Madeira.

References

External links 
catedra.pontedeume.es
Nobiliário de familias de Portugal (ANDRADES)

1470s births
1527 deaths
15th-century Portuguese people
16th-century Portuguese people
Portuguese nobility
Portuguese Roman Catholics